= 1945–46 Plunket Shield season =

Cricket tournament in New Zealand

1945–46 Plunket Shield
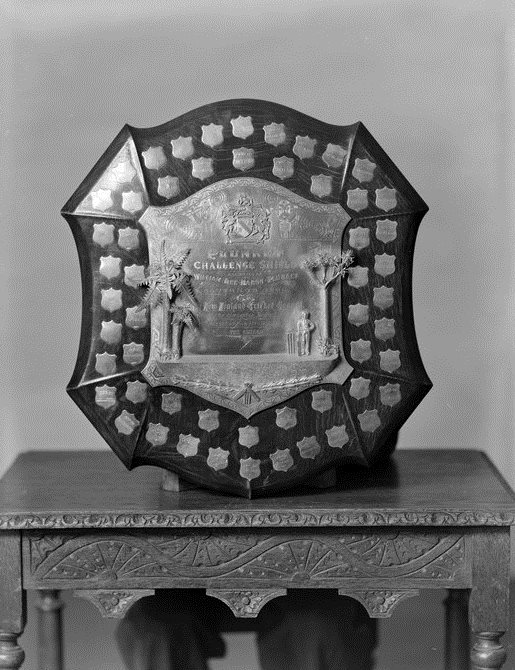
- The Plunket Shield trophy
- Cricket format: First-class
- Tournament format(s): Round-robin
- Champions: Canterbury (4th title)
- Participants: 4
- Matches: 6

The 1945–46 Plunket Shield season was a tournament of the Plunket Shield, the domestic first-class cricket competition of New Zealand. It was the first season for six years following the conclusion of World War II.

Canterbury won the championship, finishing at the top of the points table at the end of the round-robin tournament between the four first-class sides, Auckland, Canterbury, Otago and Wellington. Eight points were awarded for a win, four points for having a first innings lead in a draw and two points for a first innings deficit in a draw.

== Table ==
Below are the Plunket Shield standings for the season:

Team	Played	Won	Lost	Drawn	Points	NetRpW
Canterbury	3	2	0	1	20	3.575
Auckland	3	1	0	2	14	10.055
Otago	3	1	1	1	10	-2.159
Wellington	3	0	3	0	0	-9.065
